The 2006 AFL Women's National Championships took place in Sydney, New South Wales, Australia. The tournament began on 19 June and ended on 24 June 2006. The 2006 tournament was the 15th Championship, the previous one being held in Melbourne in 2005. The Senior-vics of Victoria won the 2006 Championship, defeating Western Australia in the final. It was Victoria's 14th successive title.

Ladder
  Victoria-Senior
  Western Australia
  Queensland
  Victoria-U19
  Northern Territory
  Australian Capital Territory
  South Australia
  New South Wales
 Australian Defence Force

All-Australian Team
VIC Seniors: Michelle Dench (Melb Uni), Shannon McFerran (St Albans), Meg Hutchins (Deakin), Lauren Tesoriero (Yarra Valley), Janine Milne (Darebin).

VIC U19's: Daisy Pearce (Darebin), Karen Paxman (Hadfield), Penny Cula-Reid (St Kilda), Moana Hope (Darebin), Lauren Arnell (Darebin).

ACT: Kirsten Ireland (Riverina)

ADF: Emma Hender (Eastlake)

NSW: Talei Owen (UNSW/Easts)

NT: Michaeline Brown (St Mary's)

QLD: Katherine Pender (Centrals), Aastra O'Connor (Logan), Joanne Butland (North Cairns)

SA: Michele Reid (Greenacres)

WA: Nikki Harwood (Melville Dockers), Krystle Rivers (Coastal Titans), Louise Knitter (The Hawks), Jodie White (Coastal Titans).

External links
Nationals wrap up from the Sydney AFL - host of the tournament
National Results from the AFL site

2006
2006 in Australian rules football
AFL